Guaraci is a municipality in the northern part of the state of São Paulo in Brazil. The population is 11,287 (2020 est.) in an area of 641.50 km². The elevation is 481 meters.

References

External links
  http://www.guaraci.sp.gov.br
  citybrazil.com.br

Municipalities in São Paulo (state)
Populated places established in 1944